The governor of Siquijor is the local chief executive and head of the Provincial Government of Siquijor in the Philippines. Along with the governors of Bohol, Cebu, Negros Oriental, the province's chief executive is a member of the Regional Development Council of the Central Visayas Region.

History
From 1901 - 1971, the chief executive of the Siquijor subprovince was the Lieutenant governor reporting under the civil governor of Negros Oriental.

On July 18, 1966, although Siquijor was still a subprovince, Lt. Governor designation was changed to Governor through Republic Act No. 4851.

On September 17, 1971, Siquijor became an independent province through Republic Act No. 6398. Subsequently, the first provincial election was held on November 8, 1971.

List of governors of Siquijor

References

Governors of provinces of the Philippines